Fan Zhiyi (born 6 November 1969) is a Chinese coach and former international footballer. He played as a defender for Shanghai Shenhua, Crystal Palace, Dundee, Shanghai COSCO Huili, Cardiff City, Buler Rangers and Shanghai Zobon.

He was considered a trailblazer in his native homeland when Sun Jihai and he became the first two Chinese footballers to play in the English leagues, joining Crystal Palace in 1998. Internationally, he would go on to play with the Chinese national team in the 2002 FIFA World Cup. He has since gone on to become a football coach and had his first stint as manager at Shanghai East Asia.

Club career 
Fan Zhiyi was considered a talented youngster and integrated into the Chinese National B Team which was allowed to take part in the Chinese football league system for a season. His time with them was extremely successful and he was even able to win the Chinese league title with the team in the 1989 league season before he had to return to Shanghai Shenhua. After returning to Shanghai and playing in his first season as a professional, Fan's best was brought out of him due to the improved level of play. His superb fitness and hardworking ethics as well as his excellent positional play as a central defender would see him become a regular within the team. By the 1995 league season, he had already gained a reputation as tough tackler who had superb aerial ability especially from set-piece plays, however he would also show his versatility as a player when he played in several positions including a provisional striker when he was the league's top goalscorer with fifteen goals as he guided Shanghai Shenhua towards the league title in the 1995 season. After several seasons he had now settled into central defense as a sweeper and would captain his side as they won Chinese FA Cup in 1998.

In the 1998–99 season, Fan made national headlines when he left Shanghai to join First Division side Crystal Palace where he and Sun Jihai became the first Chinese footballers in the English leagues. Fan soon established himself as an important player at Crystal Palace and was very popular with the fans and staff as well as winning the club many new fans back in China. He was also the captain of Crystal Palace for a while and scored several important goals for the club. As he played for Crystal Palace, Fan would also play in the 2000 AFC Asian Cup for the Chinese national team before personally winning Asian Footballer of the Year in 2001. After helping China qualify for the 2002 FIFA World Cup in October 2001, Fan transferred to Scottish Premier League side Dundee for £350,000. He managed to score against Celtic in a 3–1 loss with a good long-distance shot after positioning himself well after he received a pass from Nacho Novo.

After returning from the 2002 FIFA World Cup, Fan decided not to return to Dundee and decided to return to China to join top-tier club Shanghai International for a brief period. He would soon return to the United Kingdom where he had a trial with Gillingham F.C., however Fan decided to join Second Division side Cardiff City in November 2002.

In October 2003, he signed a one-year contract to become player-coach of Hong Kong First Division League side Buler Rangers. However, his stay in Hong Kong lasted only a few months when, in early 2004, he moved back to Shanghai to become the captain of China League One side Zhuhai Zobon. He led the club to promotion to the Chinese Super League one year later and the club renamed to Shanghai Zobon after it moved to Shanghai. Fan left the club after the 2005 season and joined Buler Rangers for a second stint but after five games, he decided to end his playing career and retired.

International career
Fan was a key veteran of the Chinese national team that qualified for the 2002 FIFA World Cup, their first time qualifying for the tournament. After returning from the 2002 FIFA World Cup, Fan announced his retirement from the national team after ten years where he was an anchor in the defense and was capped 106 times for his country.

Management career
Fan often stated that his desire was to move into management and had brief spells as an assistant coach with Buler Rangers and Shanghai Zobon while he was still playing. Once he retired from playing football, he became a technical director and assistant coach at China League Two side Suzhou Trips. Fan became manager of China League One side Shanghai East Asia in 2010, but he was sacked at the end of the 2010 season.

Career statistics

International goals
Results list China's goal tally first.

Honours

Player

Club
Chinese National B Team
Chinese Jia-A League: 1989

Shanghai Shenhua
Chinese Jia-A League: 1995
Chinese FA Cup: 1998

Individual
Asian Footballer of the Year: 2001
Chinese Football Association Player of the Year: 1995, 1996, 2001
Chinese Jia-A League Team of the Year: 1995, 1996, 1997
Chinese Jia-A League Top goalscorer: 1995
Crystal Palace Player of the Year: 2001

Filmography

Variety shows

See also
 List of men's footballers with 100 or more international caps

References

External links
Fifa World Cup 2002 at bbc.co.uk

1969 births
Living people
Chinese footballers
Footballers from Shanghai
Chinese football managers
China international footballers
FIFA Century Club
Shanghai Shenhua F.C. players
Crystal Palace F.C. players
English Football League players
Chinese expatriate footballers
Chinese expatriate sportspeople in England
Expatriate footballers in England
Cardiff City F.C. players
Expatriate footballers in Wales
2002 FIFA World Cup players
1992 AFC Asian Cup players
1996 AFC Asian Cup players
2000 AFC Asian Cup players
Dundee F.C. players
Expatriate footballers in Scotland
Scottish Premier League players
Beijing Renhe F.C. players
Hong Kong Rangers FC players
Hong Kong First Division League players
Expatriate footballers in Hong Kong
Asian Footballer of the Year winners
Asian Games medalists in football
Footballers at the 1994 Asian Games
Footballers at the 1998 Asian Games
Asian Games silver medalists for China
Asian Games bronze medalists for China
Association football defenders
Medalists at the 1994 Asian Games
Medalists at the 1998 Asian Games
Association football coaches
Shanghai Shenhua F.C. non-playing staff
Chinese expatriate sportspeople in Scotland
Chinese expatriate sportspeople in Wales
Chinese expatriate sportspeople in Hong Kong